The Porthgain Railway was a 3 ft (914 mm) narrow gauge industrial railway connecting the Pen Clegyr and St. Bride's quarries with Porthgain harbour. It operated from the late 1880s until 1931.

The line of the track can still be traced as a levelled strip on the clifftop, adjacent to the path to Porthgain harbour.

Locomotives

See also 
 Abereiddy
 British industrial narrow gauge railways
 Industrial railway

References 

 
 

3 ft gauge railways in Wales
Rail transport in Pembrokeshire